This is a list of child actors from Sweden. Films and/or television series they appeared in are mentioned only if they were still a child at the time of filming.

Current child actors (under the age of eighteen) are indicated by boldface.

A 
Björn Andrésen (born 1955)
Death in Venice (1971)

D 
Alexandra Dahlström (born 1984)
Sanning eller konsekvens (1997)
Fucking Åmål (1998)
Tomten är far till alla barnen (1999)

G 
Anton Glanzelius (born 1974)
My Life as a Dog (1985)

H
Dan Håfström (born 1972)
1984: Ronia, the Robber's Daughter
1987: Idag röd 
Kåre Hedebrant (born 1995)
Amors Baller (English: Cupid's Balls) (2011)
Let the Right One In (2008)

K 
Melinda Kinnaman (born 1971)
My Life as a Dog (1985)

L 
Lina Leandersson (born 1995)
Let the Right One In (2008)

Rebecka Liljeberg (born 1981)
Sunes jul (1991)
Längtans blåa blomma (1998)
Närkontakt (1997)
Fucking Åmål (1998)

N
Inger Nilsson (born 1959)
 1969: Pippi Longstocking
 1969: Pippi Longstocking
 1969: Pippi Goes on Board
 1970: Pippi in the South Seas
 1970: Pippi on the Run
 1973: Här kommer Pippi Långstrump

O 
 Jan Ohlsson (born 1962)
 1971: Emil i Lönneberga
 1972: New Mischief by Emil
 1973: Emil and the Piglet
 1977: Terror of Frankenstein
 1978: Dante – akta’re för Hajen!

P 

 Maria Persson (born 1959)
 1969: Pippi Longstocking
 1969: Pippi Longstocking
 1969: Pippi Goes on Board
 1970: Pippi in the South Seas
 1970: Pippi on the Run
 1973: Här kommer Pippi Långstrump

S 

 Pär Sundberg (born 1957)
 1969: Pippi Longstocking
 1969: Pippi Longstocking
 1969: Pippi Goes on Board
 1970: Pippi in the South Seas
 1970: Pippi on the Run
 1973: Här kommer Pippi Långstrump

Z 

 Hanna Zetterberg (born 1973)
 1984: Ronia, the Robber's Daughter

List
Sweden